The primary national holiday is Independence Day which is celebrated on November 22.

National holidays

Other Holidays

See also
 Culture of Lebanon

References

 
Lebanon
Holidays